Cladosporium arthropodii is a fungus. It was discovered between 2005 and 2007 and recorded as potentially endemic to New Zealand in the Country Report of New Zealand issued by the Asia and Pacific Plant Protection Organization. It was recorded as using Arthropodium cirratum (the rengarenga plant) as a host.

References

Sources 
 Asia and Pacific Plant Protection Organization, Country Report of New Zealand, August 2007

Cladosporium
Fungal plant pathogens and diseases
Monocot diseases
Fungi described in 2006
Fungi of New Zealand